William Ralph Miller (November 24, 1924 – July 9, 1991) was an American professional basketball player. He played in the Basketball Association of America (BAA) for the Chicago Stags and St. Louis Bombers during the 1948–49 season.  Prior to playing in the BAA, Miller played collegiate basketball at Eastern Kentucky Teachers College and then at the University of North Carolina Chapel Hill.

After the NBA, Miller became a college coach for Campbellsville Junior College and Elon University. Between 1968 and 1974, Miller led Elon to six straight 20-win seasons. In the Winter of 1973, Miller was selected to coach the NAIA All-Stars - which went on to defeat the NCAA All-Stars 107-78 in High Point, N.C.  Miller ended his career with 329 wins at Elon, still the most in program history.

BAA career statistics

Regular season

Playoffs

References

External links

1924 births
1991 deaths
American men's basketball players
American military personnel of World War II
Basketball coaches from Kentucky
Basketball players from Kentucky
Campbellsville Tigers men's basketball coaches
Chicago Stags players
Eastern Kentucky Colonels men's basketball players
Elon Phoenix men's basketball coaches
Forwards (basketball)
High school basketball coaches in the United States
Junior college men's basketball coaches in the United States
North Carolina Tar Heels men's basketball players
People from Berea, Kentucky
St. Louis Bombers (NBA) players
Undrafted National Basketball Association players